The 2021 Citrus Bowl was a college football bowl game played on January 1, 2021, with kickoff at 1:00 p.m. EST on ABC. It was the 75th edition of the Citrus Bowl, and was one of the 2020–21 bowl games concluding the 2020 FBS football season. Sponsored by Vrbo, a vacation rental marketplace owned by the HomeAway division of Expedia, the game was officially known as the Vrbo Citrus Bowl.

Teams
The game featured the Auburn Tigers of the Southeastern Conference (SEC) and the Northwestern Wildcats of the Big Ten Conference. This was the second meeting between the two programs, and first since the 2010 Outback Bowl, won by Auburn, 38–35.

Auburn Tigers

Auburn entered the game with a 6–4 record, unranked in the AP Poll. They finished in third place in the SEC's West Division. The Tigers faced four ranked teams during the season, losing to Georgia, Alabama, and Texas A&M while defeating Kentucky. Their only other loss was to South Carolina. Prior to the Citrus Bowl, Auburn fired head coach Gus Malzahn, who had led the program for eight seasons. Defensive coordinator Kevin Steele served as interim head coach for the Tigers.

Northwestern Wildcats

Northwestern entered the game with a 6–2 record, ranked 15th in the AP Poll. The Wildcats won the Big Ten's West Division, but fell to Ohio State in the Big Ten Championship Game, 22–10. Their only other loss was to Michigan State. Northwestern faced two ranked opponents, losing to Ohio State and defeating Wisconsin. The Wildcats were led by head coach Pat Fitzgerald, in his 15th season with the program.

Game summary

Statistics

See also
2020 Cure Bowl, played at the same venue six days earlier
2020 Cheez-It Bowl, played at the same venue three days earlier

References

External links

Game statistics at statbroadcast.com

Citrus Bowl
Citrus Bowl (game)
Citrus Bowl
Citrus Bowl
Auburn Tigers football bowl games
Northwestern Wildcats football bowl games